The women's 4 × 5 kilometre relay event of the FIS Nordic World Ski Championships 2015 was held on 26 February 2015.

Results
The race was started at 13:30.

References

Women's 4 x 5 kilometre relay
2015 in Swedish women's sport